The 1985–86 Bradford City A.F.C. season was the 73rd in the club's history.

The club finished 13th in Division Two, reached the 3rd round of the FA Cup, and the 2nd round of the Milk Cup.

Following damage to home stadium Valley Parade at the end of the 1984–85 season during the Bradford City fire, the club played all 'home' matches during the 1985–86 season at neutral grounds, namely Elland Road in Leeds, Leeds Road in Huddersfield and Odsal in Bradford. It cost £2.6million to redevelop Valley Parade.

Sources

References

Bradford City A.F.C. seasons
Bradford City